Aphrodisias, sometimes called Aphrodisias of Cilicia to distinguish it from the town of the same name in Caria, was a port city of ancient Cilicia whose ruins now lie near Cape Tisan in Mersin Province, Turkey.

Geography 
Aphrodisias is situated on Cape Tisan near the town of Yeşilovacık in the rural area of Silifke ilçe (district) which itself is a part of Mersin Province. The ancient name of this region was Cilicia Trachea ("rugged Cilicia") So it is customary to call the ruins Aphrodisias of Cilicia to distinguish it from the better-known Aphrodisias  in Aydin Province. The ruins are at the east side of the cape facing Dana Island  and Tisan Island.

History 
The foundation date of the ancient settlement is unknown. But it was a port of Ptolemaic Egypt in the fourth century BC. The settlement was incorporated into the Seleucid Empire and later into the Roman Empire. In the marine book Ps.Skylax written in 101 AD, the settlement was named Cap Aphrodisias . During the early Middle Ages when the port was a part of Byzantine Empire, it was named Porto Cavaliere. Then it faded away. The location of the long forgotten ruins was discovered by Austrian Archaeologist Rudolf Heberdey in  1891.

The famous Greek physician Xenocrates was from Aphrodisias.

The ruins 
There are ruins of a necropolis, a cistern, city walls and floor mosaics of a 4th-century  church named St.Panteleon (The church was a temple prior to Christianity). In 1987, Ludwig Budde from Germany published his book St.Pantaleon von Aphrodisias in Kılikien about the church. But most of the mosaics are not unearthed yet.

References 

Archaeological sites in Mersin Province, Turkey
Former populated places in Turkey
Aphrodite
Ancient Greek archaeological sites in Turkey
Populated places in ancient Cilicia